The chapters of the manga series Sensual Phrase were written by Mayu Shinjo. The first chapter premiered in Shōjo Comic in 1997, where it was serialized monthly until its conclusion in 2000. The series focuses on the romance between Sakuya Ookochi, the lead singer of a Japanese band known for its explicit lyrics, and Aine Yukimura, a high school student who becomes their lyricist after Sakuya accidentally reads the lyrics of a song she has written. In addition to their own relationship insecurities, Aine struggles to deal with jealous fans, unwanted attention from other men, and enemies of the band seeking to use her to hurt Sakuya.

The individual chapters were collected and published in 17 tankōbon volumes by Shogakukan under their "Flower Comics" imprint starting on June 26, 1997; the last volume was released on January 26, 2001. An additional volume was released on April 24, 2003 containing a sequel chapter for the story and additional unrelated short stories. Shogakukan republished the serialized chapters across six shinsoban hard cover editions in 2003 and re-released the original 17 volumes in 2006 with new covers. Sensual Phrase was adapted into six light novels containing side stories from the series. The series was also adapted into a 44-episode anime series by Studio Hibari that aired in Japan on TV Tokyo from April 20, 1999 to March 25, 2000. The anime was partially a prequel to the manga focusing on the band's beginnings more than Aine and Sakuya's relationship. The manga series is licensed for regional language releases by Editorial Ivréa in Spain and Latin America, Pika Edition in France, Egmont Manga & Anime in Germany, and Star Comics in Italy.

Sensual Phrase is licensed for an English-language release in North America by Viz Media, including the special final volume. It released the first volume of the series on March 24, 2004; the final volume was released on February 13, 2007.


Volume listing

Notes

References

External links
 Mayu Shinju's official Sensual Phrase page
 Official Viz Media Sensual Phrase page
 

Sensual Phrase